Carpipramine (Prazinil, Defekton) is an atypical antipsychotic used for the treatment of schizophrenia and anxiety in France and Japan. In addition to its neuroleptic and anxiolytic effects, carpipramine also has hypnotic properties. It is structurally related to both tricyclics like imipramine and butyrophenones like haloperidol.

See also 
 Clocapramine
 Mosapramine
 Penfluridol (typical antipsychotic)

References 

Atypical antipsychotics
Carboxamides
Dibenzazepines
Piperidines